Valerie Kathleen Lehman  (née Willis; born 15 March 1943) is an Australian actress and director, best known locally and internationally for her role as the antagonist "Top Dog" and self-styled Queen Bea Smith in the Australian TV series Prisoner (known internationally as Prisoner: Cell Block H) for the first 5 series. from 1979 until 1983.

Biography

Early life and personal life

Lehman  was born in Perth, Western Australia, on 15 March 1943, she relocated to Melbourne to study arts at the RMIT University.Lehman was twice married her first husband was Frank  Lehman , she married Charles Collins in 1989 but divorced in 2002.   She has two daughter's both whom appeared on "Prisoner", her daughter Cassandra Lehman, played her drug-addicted on-screen daughter Debbie and her other daughter Joanne also appeared as a run away. Val also was a son, Jason.

Honours and awards
In 2021 she was awarded the Order of Australia (AM) "for significant service to the performing arts and wildlife conservation".

She received three Logie Awards for her performance; Best Lead Actress in a Series, Most Popular Actress in 1982 and Best Lead Actress in a Series in 1983. Lehman decided to leave the series towards the end of season five after becoming tired with playing the character, and she recorded her final scenes on 13 May 1983, making her final appearance in episode 400.

Career
Lehman has appeared in many other Australian television productions, mostly in guest roles. Prior to Prisoner she acted in the television series Bellbird and Tandarra. After Prisoner she appeared in The Flying Doctors, Army Wives, Something in the Air, Blue Heelers, All Saints and City Homicide.

In 2016, Lehman was a contestant on the Australian version of I'm a Celebrity...Get Me Out of Here!. On 6 March 2016 she was evicted from the jungle.

Lehman had a guest role on Neighbours in December 2017 as Joanne Schwartz, which reunited her with her former Prisoner co-star Colette Mann.

Filmography

Television

Film

Awards and honours

References

External links
 

1943 births
Living people
Actresses from Perth, Western Australia
Australian film actresses
Australian soap opera actresses
Australian television actresses
Logie Award winners
People from Ballarat
People from Redland City
Actors from Ipswich
20th-century Australian actresses
21st-century Australian actresses
I'm a Celebrity...Get Me Out of Here! (Australian TV series) participants
Members of the Order of Australia